Alison Waters (born 19 March 1984 in London) is a former professional squash player from England.

Career
As a junior player, Waters won her first major squash tournament – the British Under-12 title – at the age of nine-and-a-half. She retained the title the following year. She was a three-time runner-up at the British Open Under-14 Championships. She won her first professional title in 2005 at the Forbes Open, beating Carla Khan in the final.

Waters won the British National Squash Championships in February 2010, beating Jenny Duncalf in the final 10–12, 11–7, 4–11, 11–7, 12–10. Waters also won the championship in 2008 beating Laura Lengthorn-Massaro and finished as the runner-up in 2005, 2007 and 2009.

In 2012, she was part of the England team that won the silver medal at the 2012 Women's World Team Squash Championships.

In 2014, she was part of the team that helped England reclaim the world team title by winning the gold medal at the 2014 Women's World Team Squash Championships.

In 2016, she was part of the English team that won the silver medal at the 2016 Women's World Team Squash Championships. In 2018, she won her fourth silver medal at the 2018 Women's World Team Squash Championships.

Major World Series final appearances

Malaysian Open: 1 final (0 title, 1 runner-up)

See also
 Official Women's Squash World Ranking
 WISPA Awards

References

External links

 Alison Waters official site
 
 
 

1984 births
Living people
English female squash players
Sportspeople from London
Commonwealth Games silver medallists for England
Commonwealth Games medallists in squash
Squash players at the 2006 Commonwealth Games
Squash players at the 2010 Commonwealth Games
Squash players at the 2018 Commonwealth Games
Medallists at the 2014 Commonwealth Games
Medallists at the 2022 Commonwealth Games